The men's 10,000 metres event at the 2007 Summer Universiade was held on 14 August.

Results

References
Results

10000
2007